Purpuric agave dermatitis is a skin condition caused by Agave americana, a large, thick, long-leaved, subtropical plant.

See also 
 Skin lesion

References 

Vascular-related cutaneous conditions